Maccabi Rishon LeZion is a basketball club based in Rishon LeZion, Israel. The club plays in the Liga Leumit, the second tier of Israeli basketball. The greatest achievement of the club has been winning the 2016 Israeli Basketball Premier League championship.

The club is one of the most popular basketball clubs in Israel, and has played in the Israeli Basketball Premier League since 1989. Some notable players have included Miki Berkovich, Doron Jamchi, Guy Goodes, Motti Aroesti, Kevin Magee, Moran Roth, and Hen Lippin.

History

Early years 

Maccabi Rishon LeZion was founded in 1976 by 28-year-old Itzhak Perry, and reached the top division Israeli Basketball Premier League, where they have remained since the 1988–89 season. At the start of their first season in the top division, Israeli star Miki Berkovich joined Richard Rellford, and they led the team. Their coach was Moshe Vainkretz, and they finished the season in 6th place. In the following season, Vainkretz was replaced by Tal Tzuker, and the team finished in 9th place.

1990s 
In 1990–91, Vainkretz returned to Maccabi Rishon LeZion. With some high-quality players such as Miki Berkovich, Gene Banks, Andre Spencer, and Motti Aroesti, the team finished the regular season in 2nd place in the league. In the semi-finals of the playoffs, Maccabi Rishon LeZion beat Hapoel Tel Aviv in a 3–0 sweep, and reached their first-ever final series. In the final, they lost in four games (3–1) to Maccabi Tel Aviv. One season later, in 1991–92, most of the key players stayed and the team ended the regular season again in 2nd place. This time, they lost in the semi-finals series to Hapoel Tel Aviv. However, Maccabi Rishon LeZion reached the final of the Israel State Cup, but lost 76:84 to Hapoel Galil Elyon. They also participated in the EuroLeague, but lost in the second qualifying round to Dutch champions Den Helder, and dropped to the European Cup, where they were eliminated in the group stage with a record of 3 wins and 7 losses. At the end of the season, some key players such as Banks, Spencer, and Chaim Zlotikman left the team, and as a result the team ended in 7th place during its 1992–93 campaign, and participated in the bottom playoffs. 

The years passed and Pini Gershon returned for a second term with Maccabi Rishon LeZion in the 1997–98 season. Doron Jamchi led the team in points. Despite high expectations from Gershon, the team ended the regular season in 6th place. It lost to Hapoel Eilat in the quarterfinals. In the Korac Cup, the team lost in the third round to Polish side Stal Bobrek Bytom. In the following season, Vainkretz returned for a third term with the club and it finished the season in 9th place, and in the third round of the Korac Cup.

2000s 

After the team lost the first five games of 1999–00 season, Vainkretz resigned and was replaced by Hanan Keren. The club suffered from economic problems and injuries and finished the season in 10th place. They were not relegated, only because of league expansion. 

In 2004–05, Guy Goodes was appointed head coach. The team lost to Maccabi Tel Aviv both in the league quarterfinals and in the semi-finals of the State Cup. With Goodes as head coach, the team "recovered" from the difficult years before. Omar Sneed, John Gilchrist, and Ryan Sidney joined as foreign players, the Israelis Or Eitan and Moran Roth joined as well, and they all led Maccabi Rishon LeZion to success in 2005–06 season. Rishon Lezion finished the regular season in 3rd place. They lost in the final four to Hapoel Jerusalem on a last-second shot by Horace Jenkins. However, they beat Ironi Nahariya in the 3rd place game. Eitan and Sneed were named to the Israeli All-League First Team, and Guy Goodes was named Head Coach of the Year.

2010s 

Before the 2009–10 season, the team completely changed its front office. Effi Birnbaum was appointed head coach. Aaron McGhee, Ugonna Onyekwe, and Larry O'Bannon joined as foreign players alongside the Israeli players Avi Ben Chimol and Meir Tapiro. The team finished only 7th. They lost 3–1 to Hapoel Jerusalem in the quarterfinals. In 2010–11 Birnbaum stayed on as head coach, but the players' squad was refreshed. Magee and Tucker stayed, but the latter was later waived in the middle of the season. Isaiah Swann, Dwayne Mitchell, and Raymar Morgan arrived in addition to the Israeli forward Nitzan Hanochi. They finished a good season in 5th place, and beat Bnei Hasharon 3–2 in the quarterfinals. They qualified for the final four, where they were defeated by Maccabi Tel Aviv (100:77), and then by Hapoel Jerusalem in the 3rd place game. Dwayne Mitchell was named to the All-League First Team.

In the '11-'12 season, the team reached, for the second time in their history, the Israel State Cup final, 20 years after their first time. They lost to Maccabi Tel Aviv in Nokia Arena. In the league, Maccabi Rishon LeZion ended the regular season in 3rd place. In the quarterfinals of the playoffs, they met Ironi Ashkelon. Ashkelon won the first two games and were close to sweeping them, but Rishon won three games in a row and reached the final four. In the semi-finals, they lost 75:68 to Maccabi Ashdod, and lost also to Hapoel Holon in the 3rd place game. Kitchen was named to the All-League First Team. 

Maccabi Rishon LeZion started the 2012–13 season with Effi Birnbaum as head coach. After 11 games, with only 5 wins, the board decided to terminate Birnbaum's contract and appoint former player and coach Roni Bosani as head coach. The team finished the regular season in 6th place, and lost 3–2 to Hapoel Eilat in the quarterfinals. 

Rishon started the 2013–14 season very poorly. Former assistant coach Matan Harush was appointed head coach. He led the team for 11 games, only winning 3 games. The fans began to voice their disappointment, and Harush was fired. A few days later, he was replaced by former Maccabi Tel Aviv and Israel national basketball team coach Zvika Sherf. Even with Sherf, the team suffered from instability. The team replaced many players during the season, but Shawn Dawson and Dror Hajaj stayed. At the end of the season, Rishon and Sherf finished in 10th place, out of 12 teams. They were saved from relegation by a last matchday win.

In the following season, the team finished the regular season in 6th place. In the quarterfinals series, they beat Hapoel Holon (3:1), even without the home-court advantage. In the semi-finals, they lost to Hapoel Jerusalem, 3:0.

Champions after fairytale season (2015–16)

The 2015–16 season was a remarkable one for Rishon LeZion. Sharon Drucker was fired on the 14th of April, and was replaced by Arik Shivek. With some high-quality players such as Darryl Monroe and Mark Lyons, the team finished in sixth place in the regular season and reached the quarter-finals of FIBA Europe Cup. After Rishon Lezion beat the higher-ranked Maccabi Haifa in the playoffs, the team faced Maccabi Tel Aviv in the semi-finals. Rishon stunned the powerhouse team from Tel Aviv, winning 71–69. Rishon LeZion had the right to play in the Israeli League Final for the first time since 1991. On 9 June 2016, the club won their first championship after beating Hapoel Jerusalem 83–77 in the Final, in front of 11,000 spectators at Jerusalem's home arena. Darryl Monroe was named Final Four MVP, after scoring 20 points against Maccabi Tel Aviv and 29 points against Jerusalem.

Modern era

At the start of the 2018–19 season, Rishon LeZion won the Israeli Basketball League Cup. In the 2018–19 Premier League season, Maccabi Rishon LeZion was the sixth seed in the regular season but managed to upset third-seeded Hapoel Holon in the playoffs, winning 1–3. In the semi-final of the Final Four, the team surprised Hapoel Jerusalem and won 92–86 to advance to their second-ever final, where they lost to Maccabi Tel Aviv.

In the 2019–20 season, Rishon LeZion advanced to its third-ever Israeli League final, after Adam Ariel hit a buzzer-beater to defeat Hapoel Jerusalem in the semifinal.

Fans and arena

Gush D 

Gush D is the organized group of supporters that follows the team in home games and in away games. The group was founded in 2001, and named after their seating section in the old arena of the club, Gan Nachum. In January 2014, they started to boycott the team's home games due to a conflict with the club's owner, Itzhak Perry. However, they returned to cheer the team only one year later, in January 2015.

Gan Nahum Municipal Hall (1984–2008) 
Gan Nahum Municipal Hall was a multi-purpose sports arena with 1,500 seats. Since its opening in 1986, and until Bet Maccabi opened in 2008, it was the main sports hall in the city. It was the home arena of Maccabi Rishon since its opening day in 1986, and also hosted Maccabi and Hapoel Rishon LeZion handball clubs' home games.

The arena can host volleyball, handball, futsal, and basketball activities. It has only one stand, in the northern side of the building. In the upper floor there are 1,000 seats, and in the lower floor (which is removable) there are 500 seats. Today Gan Nahum Municipal Hall hosts the home games of the Hapoel Rishon LeZion women's basketball team.

Sponsorship names
Due to sponsorship agreements, the club has known several names:
Maccabi "Israeli Center for Furniture" Rishon LeZion (2006–2009)
Maccabi "Offici" Rishon LeZion (2009–2012)
Maccabi "Pandoor Doors" Rishon LeZion (2012–2015)
Maccabi "RAND MEDIA" Rishon LeZion (2015–2017)
Maccabi "ILAND.TV" Rishon LeZion (2017–2018)
Maccabi "Mitcham 1000" Rishon LeZion (2019)
Maccabi "Winner" Rishon LeZion (2019–present)

Current roster

Depth chart

Notable players

 
 Richard Rellford 1 season: '88-'89
 Haim Zlotikman 3 seasons: '88-'89, '90-'92
 Miki Berkovich 5 seasons: '88-'93
 Motti Aroesti 1 season: '90-'91
 Andre Spencer 2 seasons: '90-'92
 Gene Banks 2 seasons: '90-'92
 David Henderson 1 season: '91-'92
 Hen Lippin 1 season: '92-'93
 Linton Townes 1 season: '92-'93
 Kevin Magee 1 season: '93-'94
 Steve Burtt Sr. 1 season: '93-'94
 Gerald Paddio 2 seasons: '94-'95, '00-'01
 James Gully 3 seasons: '94-'97
 Brian Oliver 1 season: '95-'96
 Darren Daye 1 season: '96-'97
 Doron Jamchi 3 seasons: '96-'99
 Dennis Hopson 1 season: '97-'98
 Brad Sellers 1 season: '97-'98
 Tomas Pačėsas 1 season: '98-'99
 Deon Thomas 1 season: '98-'99
 Joe Dawson 3 seasons: '98-'01
 Afik Nissim 4 seasons: '98-'02
 Corey Gaines 1 season: '99-'00
 Avi Sukar 3 seasons: '00-'02, '08-'09
 Rowan Barrett 1 season: '01-'02
 Guy Goodes 2 seasons: '02-'04
 Lucius Davis 2 seasons: '02-'04
 Amit Ben-David 5 seasons: '02-'03, '11-'15
 Kelly McCarty 1 season: '03-'04
 Malik Dixon 1 season: '04-'05
 Erwin Dudley 1 season: '04-'05
 Tony Younger 3 seasons: '04-'05, '14-'16
 Moran Roth 1 season: '05-'06
 Ryan Sidney 2 seasons: '05-'07
 Omar Sneed 2 seasons: '05-'06, '07-'08
 Oded Shaashoua 4 seasons: '06-'09, '10-'11
 Jerel Blassingame 1 season: '07-'08
 Cedrick Banks 1 season: '07-'08
 Juan Mendez 1 season: '07-'08
 Robert Conley 1 season: '08-'09
 Igor Nesterenko 7 seasons: '08-'15
 Meir Tapiro 1 season: '09-'10
 Aaron McGhee 2 seasons: '09-'11
 Larry O'Bannon 2 seasons: '09-'10, '14
 Avi Ben-Chimol 4 seasons: '09-'10, '15-'18
 Nitzan Hanochi 7 seasons: '10-'13, '14-'18
 Isaiah Swann 2 seasons: '10-'11, '14-'15
 Dwayne Mitchell 2 seasons: '10-'11, '13
 Raymar Morgan 1 season: '10-'11
 Derwin Kitchen 1 season: '11-'12
 Joe Crawford 1 season: '11-'12
 Brandon Bowman 1 season: '11-'12
 Adrian Uter 2 seasons: '11-'13
 Julian Wright 1 season: '12-'13
 Lazeric Jones 1 season: '12-'13
 Willie Warren 1 season: '12-'13
 Shawn Dawson 5 seasons: '12-'17
 Davin White 1 season: '13-'14
 Jackie Carmichael 1 season: '14-'15
 Chris Wright 1 season: '15-'16
 Mark Lyons 1 season: '15-'16
 Darryl Monroe 2 seasons: '15-'16, '19-present
 Idan Zalmanson 3 seasons: '15-'18
 Charles Thomas 1 season: '16-'17
 Cameron Long 2 seasons: '16-'17, '18-'19
 Keith Langford 1 season: '17-'18

 Noam Dovrat (born 2002)
 Erez Markovich (born 1978)

Season by season

Italic — Still active.

Honors 
Israeli Premier League
Champions (1): 2015–16
Runners-up (2): 2018–19, 2019–20
Israeli Cup
Runners-up (4): 1991–92, 2011–12, 2018–19, 2020–21
Israeli League Cup
Winners (1): 2018

References

Rishon LeZion
Basketball
Basketball teams established in 1976
Rishon LeZion
Israeli Basketball Premier League teams